Haplochromis percoides is a species of cichlid endemic to Lake Victoria though it may now be extinct.  This species can reach a length of  SL.

References

percoides
Fish described in 1906
Taxonomy articles created by Polbot